The 2016 Kilkenny Intermediate Hurling Championship was the 52nd staging of the Kilkenny Intermediate Hurling Championship since its establishment by the Kilkenny County Board in 1929. The championship began on 2 October 2016 and ended on 6 November 2016.

On 6 November 2016, Carrickshock won the championship after a 0–13 to 0–06 defeat of Tullogher-Rosbercon in the final at Nowlan Park. It was their second championship overall and their first title since 2004.

Carrickshock's Kevin Farrell was the championship's top scorer with 1-23.

Team changes

To Championship

Promoted from the Kilkenny Junior Hurling Championship
 Glenmore

Relegated from the Kilkenny Senior Hurling Championship
 Carrickshock

From Championship

Promoted to the Kilkenny Senior Hurling Championship
 Bennettsbridge

Relegated to the Kilkenny Junior Hurling Championship
 Emeralds

Results

First round

Relegation playoff

Quarter-finals

Semi-finals

Final

Championship statistics

Top scorers

Top scorers overall

Top scorers in a single game

References

External links
 2016 Kilkenny IHC results

Kilkenny Intermediate Hurling Championship
Kilkenny Intermediate Hurling Championship